The Bada Forest Paradise is a theme park in Chaozhou Township, Pingtung County, Taiwan.

Attractions
The theme park consists of various exhibitions on plantation as well as many amusement rides.

Transportation
The theme park is accessible by walking about 2.5km (1.6mi) east of the Chaozhou Station of Taiwan Railways.

See also
 List of tourist attractions in Taiwan

References

External links
 
 

Amusement parks in Taiwan
Buildings and structures in Pingtung County
Tourist attractions in Pingtung County